The 2018–19 Danish 2nd Divisions was be divided in two groups of twelve teams in the autumn of 2018. In the spring of 2019 there was a promotion play-off and a relegation play-off. The top two teams of the promotion play-off group were promoted to the 2019–20 Danish 1st Division.

Participants

Group 1

League table

Group 2

League table

Promotion Group
The top 6 teams from each group will compete for 2 spots in the 2019–20 Danish 1st Division.

Relegation Group
The bottom 6 teams from each group will compete to avoid the 4 relegations spots to the Denmark Series.

References

3
Danish 2nd Divisions
Danish 2nd Division seasons